Branch Brook Park is a county park of Essex County, New Jersey. It is located in the North Ward of Newark, between the neighborhoods of Forest Hill and Roseville. A portion of the park is also located within the Township of Belleville.  At , Branch Brook Park is the largest public park in the city of Newark. The park is noted for the largest collection of cherry blossom trees in the United States, having over 5,000 in more than eighteen different varieties collectively called Cherryblossomland, as well as its spectacular Cherry Blossom Festival each April.

The park was formally created in 1895 by the newly created Essex County Parks Commission, making it the nation's first county park.  The area had served as an Army training ground during the American Civil War. At the time, the northern portion of the area had been a marsh known as Old Blue Jay Swamp. In 1898, a public appropriation financed the conversion of the swamp into a landscaped lake.  The initial park was only  in size but grew in the 1920s through private donations from prominent Newark families, such as the Ballantines, eventually reaching the city limit with Belleville and becoming one of the largest urban parks in the United States.  The Morris Canal originally ran on the park's west side, until its old bed was turned into the Newark City Subway, providing access to the park from Downtown Newark.

The first designs of the park, based largely on romantic garden themes, were proposed in 1895 and 1898, after the Parks Commission hired several architectural firms to plan the park. In 1900, the commission hired the Olmsted Brothers firm to redesign the park. The result was the park's current naturalistic look and feel, with acres of meadows and forests, in a manner similar to their father's earlier designs of Central Park and Prospect Park.

The park is home to many architecturally significant structures, including bridges, buildings, gates, and sculptures. Many of these were designed by the beaux-arts architectural firm of Carrère and Hastings headed by John Merven Carrère and Thomas Hastings. The pair designed two Subway Bridges now referred to as Subway 1, East and Subway 2, West.

The famous cherry trees were the result of a 1927 gift from Caroline Bamberger Fuld, sister of department store magnate Louis Bamberger and widow of the store's vice president.  The Cherry Blossom Festival attracts approximately 10,000 visitors each April. Branch Brook Park also features a lake and a pond.

During World War II, the park's grounds served a tent city for recruits, as well as a landing strip for airplanes of the United States Postal Service.

The neighborhood on the east side of the park, Forest Hill, is Newark's most affluent.   Also on the east side of the park is the Cathedral of the Sacred Heart Basilica, one of the largest cathedrals in the United States.

It has been placed on both the New Jersey (1980) and National (1981) Registers of Historic Places.

In 1999 Branch Brook Park began a $25 million ten-year restoration program.  In 2004, the Park Avenue bridge was repaired, as were the baseball fields in the center of the park. In 2007, a plan was created to provide for more than 5,000 cherry trees in the park and renovate and rename the Welcome Center. The plan uses a $650,000 grant from the Essex County Recreation and the Open Space Trust Fund from 2006 and private donations. 

In 2012, statues dedicated to sports figures Althea Gibson and Roberto Clemente were unveiled in the park. In 2013 the park was in the final phase of the restoration plan.

Gallery

See also 

 National Register of Historic Places listings in Essex County, New Jersey

References

External links
 Official site
 Essex County Cherry Blossom Festival Information, Branch Brook Park 

Belleville, New Jersey
Cherry blossom
Parks on the National Register of Historic Places in New Jersey
Geography of Newark, New Jersey
Parks in Essex County, New Jersey
Tourist attractions in Newark, New Jersey
National Register of Historic Places in Newark, New Jersey
County parks in New Jersey
Historic districts in Essex County, New Jersey
Historic districts on the National Register of Historic Places in New Jersey
Culture of Newark, New Jersey